The Newport Cup was a golf tournament on the Champions Tour from 1987 to 1992. It was played in Newport, Rhode Island at the Newport Country Club.

The purse for the 1992 tournament was US$400,000, with $60,000 going to the winner.

Winners
1992 Jim Dent
1991 Larry Ziegler
1990 Al Kelley
1989 Jim Dent
1988 Walt Zembriski
1987 Miller Barber

Source:

References

Former PGA Tour Champions events
Golf in Rhode Island
Recurring sporting events established in 1987
Recurring sporting events disestablished in 1992
1987 establishments in Rhode Island
1992 disestablishments in Rhode Island